Unforgiven is the album folk artist Tim Hardin was recording in 1980 but failed to complete due to his death of a drug overdose.

Portions of the album are incomplete studio tracks with vocals. Other songs are from home cassette demos recorded by Hardin prior to his death.

The original version of "Judge and Jury" was his last single, released in 1973 in the UK only.

Track listing

Side one 
 "Unforgiven"
 "Luna Cariba"
 "Mercy Wind"
 "If I Were Still With You"

Side two 
 "Judge and Jury"
 "Partly Yours"
 "Sweet Feeling"
 "Secret"

Personnel 
Tim Hardin – vocals, guitar, keyboards
Nicky Hopkins – piano
Jim Cuomo – piano, dombra
Ken Lauber – piano
Johnny Lee – guitar
Pete Grant – pedal steel guitar
Reginald Butler – bass
Ricky Fataar – drums
Denny Seiwell – drums
Lisa Bialac – background vocals

Production notes 
 Produced by Rob Fraboni
 Executive Producers: Don Rubin, Caroline Rubin
Tim Kramer – engineer
Matthew Katz – cover concept
Pompa – cover art

References

External links 
Tim Hardin discography site.

1981 albums
Tim Hardin albums
Albums produced by Rob Fraboni
Albums published posthumously